Ford Motor Company of Japan Limited was the Japanese subsidiary of the United States-based automaker Ford Motor Company.

History 
Since 1917, the first Ford vehicles were sold by Sales & Frazar in Japan, but without trying to build a dealer network. Although the sales department of Ford Japan considered in 1922 due to the inadequate infrastructure as unsuitable for automobiles, was recognized as part of an Asian trip by the Ford Export Manager Russell I. Roberge a potential of the Japanese market.

Ford founded a subsidiary in 1925 in Yokohama. From 1925 to 1935, the Japanese car market was dominated by American manufacturers (alongside Ford since 1926/27 General Motors and since 1930 also Chrysler). In 1930, the combined market share of Ford and General Motors was 95 percent. In addition to a new law in 1936, according to which existing foreign companies were not allowed to increase their annual production, further economic and political factors led to Ford (like other American manufacturers) virtually withdrawing from the Japanese market in 1939.

The Ford brand was outlawed altogether in 1941 after the mutual declaration of war by the Japanese government. All attempts to resume operations after the Second World War initially failed. Agreements with Nissan or Toyota could not be concluded; also a sale of the plots failed.

Ford resumed importing cars to Japan in 1974. In addition, vehicles manufactured by Mazda and branded badge engineering have been sold with the Ford logo. At least in the mid-1980s, this approach was a USP for American automotive brands in Japan. A source lists Ford as a manufacturer, but refers to the headquarters of Mazda.

In January 2016, Ford Motor Company announced that it would exit from the Japanese and Indonesian markets at the end of the year because the manufacturer did not consider these sales regions profitable for the foreseeable future.

Models
Ford had mainly offered models in Japan with left-hand drive. Some of the models sold, such as the Ford Escape, were made by Ford Lio Ho Motor in Taiwan.

References

External links
 Ford Service Japan 

Car manufacturers of Japan
Ford Motor Company
Vehicle manufacturing companies established in 1925
Vehicle manufacturing companies disestablished in 2016
Japanese subsidiaries of foreign companies
Japanese companies established in 1925
Japanese companies disestablished in 2016
Defunct motor vehicle manufacturers of Japan